Pierre de Bérulle (4 February 1575 – 2 October 1629) was a French Catholic priest, cardinal and statesman, one of the most important mystics of the 17th century in France. He was the founder of the French school of spirituality, who could count among his friends and disciples Vincent de Paul and Francis de Sales.

Life

Bérulle was born in the Château of Cérilly, near Troyes in Champagne, into two families of distinguished magistrates on 4 February 1575. The château de Cérilly is situated in the modern department of Yonne, while the village adjacent to it, Bérulle, is in Aube. He was educated by the Jesuits at Clermont and at the Sorbonne in Paris. He published his first work, his Bref Discours de l'abnegation interieure, in 1597. Soon after his ordination as a priest in 1599, he assisted Cardinal Duperron in his public controversy with the Protestant Philippe de Mornay, and made numerous converts.

With the co-operation of his cousin, Madame Acarie (Marie of the Incarnation), in 1604 he introduced the Discalced Carmelite nuns of the reform of Teresa of Ávila into France.

In 1608, Vincent de Paul moved to Paris, where he came under the influence of Abbé (later Cardinal) Pierre de Bérulle, whom he took as his spiritual director. De Bérulle was responsible for De Paul taking up an appointment to the parish of Clichy.

A mainstay of the Counter-Reformation in France, in 1611 Bérulle founded in Paris the Congregation of the French Oratory, on the model of the one founded in 1556 by Philip Neri at Rome. Owing to the differences of time and place, the French congregation varied in some important respects from the Italian Oratory; whereas in the Italian congregation the houses were independent of one another, de Bérulle placed the government of all the houses in the hands of the superior-general.

Statesman
Bérulle was a chaplain to King Henry IV of France, and several times declined his offers to be made a bishop. He obtained the necessary dispensations from Rome for Henrietta Maria's marriage to Charles I, and acted as her chaplain during the first year of her stay in England. In 1626, as French ambassador to Spain, he concluded the favourable Treaty of Monzón, to which his enemy Cardinal Richelieu found objections. After the reconciliation of King Louis XIII with his mother, Marie de Medici, through his agency, he was appointed a councillor of state, but had to resign this office, owing to his pro-Habsburg policy, which was opposed by Richelieu. For religious reasons, Cardinal Bérulle favored the allegiance of France with Austria and Spain, the other Catholic powers, while Cardinal Richelieu wanted to undermine their influence in Europe. He was made cardinal by Pope Urban VIII on 30 August 1627, but never received the red hat.

Pierre de Bérulle died October 2, 1629 in Paris, while celebrating Mass, and was buried in the chapel of the Oratorian College of Juilly.

French School of Spirituality

In the early part of his career, Bérulle was confident of the ability of the individual to both remake society and reform the church. Relying on human reason and diligent effort, he worked to convert the Huguenots through theological treatises and conferences. When his efforts seemed to have little effect, he came to the realization that everything depended on God, and that one should attempt to live in accordance with the will of God without concern for success or failure.

Bérulle is generally regarded as being an initiator of the French School of Spirituality, a powerful spiritual, missionary, and reform movement that animated the church in France in the early seventeenth century. The movement was characterized by: 
a deep sense of God's grandeur and of the Church as the Body of Christ, a certain pessimistic Augustinian view of man that nonetheless stresses positive potential through God, and a strong apostolic and missionary commitment.

Bérulle's depiction of the mystical journey through Mary to Christ, and through Christ to the Trinity is a hallmark of the French School of spirituality.

The term 'School' is potentially problematic, though, because the other commonly cited members of this 'School', such as Jean Eudes, Jean-Jacques Olier, Louis-Marie Grignion de Montfort, and Jean-Baptiste de la Salle, do not simply develop the thought of Bérulle, but all have their own significant insights. The 'School' does not therefore have simply one founder (a role Bérulle has sometimes been cast in). However, the many common elements among these writers (such as an emphasis on living in the Spirit of Jesus, particular forms of meditative prayer, a pedagogy institutionalised in particular seminaries and schools), means that it can be considered as a distinct tradition of spirituality.
Recently, substantial Calvinist influences on Berulle were discovered, which are claimed to have caused his theology of the priesthood to overemphasize the priest's losing his own personality and gaining Christ's, thus preparing the 19th-century culture of Catholic clericalism.

Philosophy and Works
Bérulle encouraged Descartes' philosophical studies, and it was through him that the Samaritan Pentateuch, recently brought over from Constantinople, was inserted in Lejay's Bible Polyglotte (1628–45).

Bérulle was an opponent of the abstract school of mysticism that by-passed the humanity of Christ; Pope Urban VIII called him the "apostle of the incarnate Word". Highly influenced by Sixteenth- and Seventeenth-Century deference to monarchs, Berulle applied the same principles in the spiritual realm. In his Discours de l'état et des grandeurs de Jésus Bérulle emphasized Jesus as the Incarnate Word of God, and the abasement, self-surrender, servitude and humiliation— all Bérulle's words— of his Incarnation.  He even took the Incarnation as the defining characteristic of his spirituality and his Oratory, when he asked Christ "that, in this piety, devotion, and special servitude to the mystery of Your Incarnation and of Your humanized divinity and deified humanity, be our life and our state, our spirit and our particular difference."

The chief works of Cardinal de Bérulle are: 
 Bref discours de l'abnégation intérieure (Brief Discourse on Interior Abnegation), (1597). 
 Traité des énergumènes (Treatise on the Possessed), (Troyes, 1599). (This addresses the nature of diabolical possession, a topic of much controversy at the time. Diabolical possession, Bérulle argued, consists "precisely in a right which the malign spirit has of residing in [the possessed person's] body and of altering it in some manner."  At its heart lay the profound diabolical hostility to the Incarnation, such that Satan, through possession, attempts to ape God, becoming "incarnate" himself.)
 Trois Discours de controverse (Three Discourses of Controversy), (Paris, 1609), on various subjects. 
 Discours de l'état et des grandeurs de Jésus (Discourse on the State and Grandeurs of Jesus), (Paris, 1623). This work was reprinted several times; the substance and often the actual expressions are to be found in the diffuse Méditations of Father Bourgoing and also in Bossuet's Elévations sur les mystères. The work was also popular among Jansenists.
 Vie de Jésus (Life of Jesus), (Paris, 1629). This was a sequel to the preceding work, which the author left unfinished at the time of his death, having only had the time to consider the mystery of the Annunciation and partially (in a draft) the Visitation.
 Elévation à Jésus-Christ sur Sainte Madeleine (Elevation to Jesus Christ Regarding St. [Mary] Magdalene), (Paris, 1627).

In addition, Bérulle wrote a number of short devotional works (Œuvres de pieté) and documents for the guidance of the Oratory.

Bérulle's works, edited by P. Bourgoing (2 vols., 1644) were reprinted, by Migne in 1857.

A selected modern English translation is available as Bérulle and the French School: Selected Writings, trans Lowell M Glendon, (New York: Paulist Press, 1989).

References

"Pierre de Bérulle", Jean-Pierre Papon, Dictionnaire (in French)

1575 births
1629 deaths
17th-century French cardinals
Cardinals created by Pope Urban VIII
17th-century Christian mystics
17th-century French Catholic theologians
Burials in Île-de-France
Founders of Catholic religious communities
French Christian mystics
French nobility
French Oratory mystics
French school of spirituality
Lycée Louis-le-Grand alumni
People from Yonne
Roman Catholic mystics